Mariana Enríquez (Buenos Aires, 1973) is an Argentine journalist, novelist, and short story writer.

Early life
Enríquez was born in 1973 in Buenos Aires, and grew up in Valentín Alsina, a suburb in the Greater Buenos Aires metropolitan area. Parts of her family hail from North-Eastern Argentina (Corrientes and Misiones) and Paraguay. Enríquez would later move alongside her family to La Plata, where she became part of the local literary and punk scenes. This would inspire her to study journalism with a focus on rock music.

Career
Mariana Enríquez holds a degree in Journalism and Social Communication from the National University of La Plata. She works as a journalist and is the deputy editor of the arts and culture section of the newspaper Página/12, and she dictates literature workshops.

Enriquez has published the novels: Bajar es lo peor (Espasa Calpe, 1995), Cómo desaparecer completamente (Emecé, 2004) and Nuestra parte de noche (Anagrama, 2019). She is also the author of two short story collections, Los peligros de fumar en la cama (Emecé, 2009) and Las cosas que perdimos en el fuego (Editorial Anagrama, 2016), and the novelette Chicos que vuelven (Eduvim, 2010). Her stories have appeared in anthologies of Spain, Mexico, Chile, Bolivia and Germany.

In 2017 Las cosas que perdimos en el fuego was translated into English by Megan McDowell, and published as Things We Lost in the Fire in by Portobello Books in the U.K. and Hogarth in the U.S.

In 2019 she won the Herralde Prize for her fourth novel, Nuestra parte de noche ("Our Share of Night").

Bibliography

Novels 
 
 
 
 
 Translated as:

Short fiction 
Collections
 
 Translated as: 
 
 Translated as: 
Novelettes
 
 
Short stories

Non-fiction

References 

1973 births
Living people
Argentine people of Paraguayan descent
Argentine women novelists
Argentine women short story writers
Writers from Buenos Aires
People from La Plata
National University of La Plata alumni
The New Yorker people
20th-century Argentine short story writers
21st-century Argentine short story writers
20th-century Argentine novelists
21st-century Argentine novelists
20th-century Argentine women writers
20th-century Argentine writers
21st-century Argentine women writers
21st-century Argentine writers
20th-century journalists
21st-century journalists
Argentine women journalists
Argentine journalists
Journalists from Buenos Aires